Michèle Cointet is a French historian. She is a professor of 20th century history at the University of Poitiers. She is the recipient of two prizes from the Académie française: the Prix François Millepierres for Vichy capitale, 1940-1944 in 1994, and the Prix François Millepierres for L’Église sous Vichy. La repentance en question in 1999.

Works

References

Living people
20th-century French historians
Historians of Vichy France
Year of birth missing (living people)
21st-century French historians